Murray Park may refer to:

Australia 
Murray Park CAE (College of Advanced Education), South Australia
Murray River National Park, South Australia
Murray-Sunset National Park, Victoria
Murray Valley National Park, New South Wales

Canada 
Murray Beach Provincial Park, New Brunswick

United Kingdom 
Former name of the Rangers Training Centre, the training ground of the Scottish football team Rangers F.C.
Murray Park School, a maths and computing specialist school in Mickleover, Derby, England

United States 
Murray Park, California, an unincorporated community in Marin County
Murray City Park, a municipal park in Murray, Utah
Murray Central Park, a municipal park in Murray, Kentucky
Lake Murray State Park, Oklahoma

See also 
Murray (disambiguation)